Benedict Raditya Utomo, also known as Ben Utomo (born ) is an American-born Indonesian rapper.

Career

As an independent artist
As a teenager, he started rapping for fun with his friends and found his passion. In 2007, Ben met some Indonesian rappers online through MySpace, which led to his exposure to the Indonesian hip-hop scene. Ben Utomo starts his career as a featured artist in Young Lex song titled Gue, Lo, Mereka in 2015; and then he released his debut album in 2016 called Lost in Music. Ben released his second album titled, Die As a King No Option. Ben also co-found AllDay Music, a hip-hop collective based on Jakarta.

Signed with Def Jam
At 2019, Ben was signed by Def Jam SEA, and in 2020, Ben released his singles on Def Jam titled Indo Kid, Itu Selalu, and Mama Knows. Ben also released his first album titled Indo Kid on April 16, 2021.

Controversy

Feud with Young Lex
Due to Young Lex statement on an interview on TV show in 2016, Ben Utomo and Ecko Show released a diss track titled On Dat Bullshit, even though Ben was featured on Young Lex song.

Feud with Xaqhala
In 2018, Xaqhala writes an essay in HellMagz (an in-house magazine published by Hellhouse for hip-hop enthusiasts) titled Ketika Battle Rap Keseleo (When Rap Battle Torn Apart), in the essay, Xaqhala writes:

Ben is extremely angry when he reads the article, and then he released a diss track against Xaqhala titled Basian, and in November, Xaqhala released a rebuttal track against Ben and Saykoji titled Phone Call From Hell. However, Ben released another diss track titled xaqhala-ka-boom-boom, in which he says:

Due to Xaqhala-Ben Utomo feud, all Indonesian rappers throwing diss tracks one-each-other.

Discography

Studio albums 
 Lost in Music (2016)
 Die As a King No Option (2017)
 Do Something (2018)
 Indo Kid (2021)

Singles 
Basian (2018)
Xaqhala-ka-boom-boom (2018)
 Itu Selalu (2020)
 Mama Knows (2020)
Indo Kid (2020)
Indo Kid 2 (2022)

Featured
 Gue, Lo, Mereka (Young Lex, featuring Ben Utomo and Edgar; 2015)
 On Dat Bullshit (Ecko Show, featuring Ben Utomo; 2016)

References

American people of Indonesian descent
American rappers of East Asian descent

Living people
1990 births

id:Ben Utomo